Corso di Francia, informally called Corso Francia, is a street in the northern area of Rome (Italy).
It runs in a south–north direction between the Quarters Parioli and Tor di Quinto and, together with the nearby Via del Foro Italico and Viale Guglielmo Marconi, is the only urban road in the town to overpass the Tiber keeping the same name on both banks.

The street, named after France, is divided into two parts. The second part passes under the overpass of Via del Foro Italico and continues until the junction between Via Cassia Nuova and Via Flaminia Nuova.

Transports 
 Train stops (Piazza Euclide and Acqua Acetosa, Rome–Viterbo railway).

Notes

Bibliography 

Francia
Rome Q. II Parioli
Rome Q. XVIII Tor di Quinto